USS C-4 (SS-15) one of five C-class submarines built for the United States Navy in the first decade of the 20th century.

Description
The C-class submarines were enlarged versions of the preceding B class, the first American submarines with two propeller shafts. They displaced  on the surface and  submerged. The C-class boats had a crew of 1 officer and 14 enlisted men.

For surface running, they were powered by two  Craig gasoline engines, each driving one propeller shaft. When submerged each propeller was driven by a  electric motor. They could reach  on the surface and  underwater.

The boats were armed with two 18 inch (450 mm) torpedo tubes in the bow. They carried two reloads, for a total of four torpedoes.

Construction and career
C-4 was laid down by Fore River Shipbuilding Company in Quincy, Massachusetts, under a subcontract from Electric Boat Company, as Bonita. She was launched on 17 June 1909 sponsored by Mrs. J. C. Townsend, and commissioned on 23 November 1909. On 11 July 1910 she collided with Submarine tender USS Castine while practicing attack maneuvers, USS Castine was beached near North Truro, Massachusetts. Castine was later refloated, repaired and returned to service. She was renamed C-4 on 17 November 1911. Assigned first to the Atlantic Torpedo Fleet, and later to the Atlantic Submarine Flotilla, Bonita plied east coast waters until May 1913, when she cleared Norfolk, Virginia for Guantánamo Bay, Cuba. Her tactical exercises and development operations continued here and from Cristobal, Panama Canal Zone, where she reported on 12 December 1913. In August 1917, sailing with two other submarines, she explored the suitability of Panamanian ports as advance submarine bases. Laid up at Coco Solo Canal Zone from 12 November 1918, C-4 was decommissioned there on 15 August 1919, and sold on 13 April 1920.

Notes

References

External links

United States C-class submarines
World War I submarines of the United States
Ships built in Quincy, Massachusetts
1909 ships